Stradów may refer to the following places in Poland:
Stradów, Lower Silesian Voivodeship (south-west Poland)
Stradów, Świętokrzyskie Voivodeship (south-central Poland)